Qaleh Qonbar may refer to:
 Qaleh-ye Qanbar, in Lorestan Province
 Qaleh Qonbar, South Khorasan